Trading Post is an unincorporated community in Linn County, Kansas, United States.

History
It is said to be one of the oldest continuously occupied locations in the state.  In 1842, a United States Army fort was built there, shortly after the end of the Civil War it was soon abandoned. The fort remained until 1865. A military post was established in 1861 and lasted until summer 1865. The Battle of Marais des Cygnes was fought here during the American Civil War.  The location derives its name from a French trading post established there about 1825.

The site is also the location of the Marais des Cygnes massacre on May 19, 1858, when Charles Hamilton was forced out of the state by Jayhawkers, freedom fighters from Kansas fighting for anti-slavery and individual liberty rights in Kansas. Hamilton returned with border ruffians from Missouri and captured 11 unarmed Jayhawkers. Hamilton and his men lead the unarmed Free-Staters into a gorge. Five of the Jayhawkers were executed on the spot by the Missouri border ruffians, five were wounded and one escaped.  John Brown was to visit the site and built a fort.

References

Further reading

External links
 Linn County maps: Current, Historic, KDOT

Unincorporated communities in Kansas
Unincorporated communities in Linn County, Kansas
Populated places established in 1842
1842 establishments in the United States